The 1911 Australian census was the first national population census held in Australia and was conducted by the Bureau of Census and Statistics. The day used for the census, was taken for the night between 2 and 3 April 1911. The total population of the Commonwealth of Australia was counted as 4,455,005 - an increase of 681,204 people, 18.05% over the 1901 "Federation" census.

The Census Volumes II and III were published on 30 September 1914. At that time it was intended to issue
shortly thereafter Volume 1.

Collection method
The first Commonwealth Statistician was George Handley Knibbs. He began his career as a licensed surveyor in government service. On Monday 3 April 1911, census collectors set out all over Australia under mostly clear skies to begin gathering in Australia's first national census forms. 
They covered suburbs to rural towns and the outback. They travelled by bike or horse where they had the transport that was needed to cover large areas, however, most travelled by foot. Some in Northern Queensland had to find their way through a flooded landscape while others in South Australia had difficulties finding water and fodder for their horses due to droughts. They had distributed the forms prior to the census day.

There was a permanent staff of the ‘Bureau of Census and Statistics’ which consisted of the Statistician (Knibbs) and many assistants, some young men working as clerks as well as a couple of messenger boys. A female typist had joined soon after. They worked in the old Rialto Building in Collins Street, Melbourne.

Collectors had to supply their own transport and cover any associated costs such as fodder and petrol. They were paid according to their method of transport. Collectors on foot were paid ten shilling a day, those on bicycle fifteens shillings a day and those on horse 20 shillings a day. Police were  used in the days immediately following the census to get travellers, swagmen and campers to provide their information. Train conductors and ships' captains were also used as collectors in the 1911 census and several subsequent censuses, to cover people travelling overnight on census night.

Census questions
"For Every Person present in the Night from 2 to 3 April 1911, or returning on 3rd April (if not included elsewhere).
1. Name in full 

2. Sex - {Write M for Male}, {Write F for Female}
3. Date of Birth: Day,   Month,   Year

4. If married, write M. If widowed, write W. If divorced, write D. If never married, write N. M.
5. Date of existing Marriage: Year...........
6. Number of Children (living and dead) from existing Marriage...........
(a) Number of Children (living and dead) from previous Marriage............
7. Relation to Head of Household
8. State if Blind or Deaf and Dumb ..............
9. Country (or Australian State) where born
10. If a British subject by parentage. write P. 
 If a British subject by Naturalization. write N.
 Race -
11. If born outside Commonwealth, state length of residence therein
(a) Date of Arrival in Commonwealth, Day, Month, Year,   .
12. Religion
13. Education
(a) At present receiving Education
14. Profession or Occupation
(a) State if Employer or Employee, &c
(b) If out of work, state period
(c) Occupation of Employer (if any).

Population and dwellings
Population counts for Australian states and territories had 4,455,005 and 19,939 full-Aboriginals (counted separately) for a total population of 4,474,944.

Note: All figures are for the census usually resident population count.

Birthplace
At the Census of 3 April 1911, each person was asked to state on a "personal" card, the "Country or Australian State where born," and to state on a "personal" card, the "Country or Australian State where born," and from the replies to this query, taken in conjunction with the other data furnished, the tables contained in Part II.

Race
At the first Australian census in 1911 only those "aboriginal natives" living near European settlements were enumerated, and the main population tables included only those of half or less Aboriginal descent. Details of those "full-blood" Aborigines enumerated were included in separate tables.

Religion
According to these figures it appears that of the 4,455,005 people in Australia on census day (3 April. 1911) 4,274,414 were Christians, 36,785 non-Christians, 14,673 are described as indefinite, 10,016 were of no religion, 83,003 objected to state to what faith, if any, they belonged, and the remaining 36,114 were unspecified.

See also
1911 in Australia
Census in Australia
Australian Bureau of Statistics

Notes

References

Censuses in Australia
Australian Bureau of Statistics
1911 in Australia
Australia